Mélissande Llorens (born on 18 June 2002) is a French international rugby union player. She plays as a winger in Blagnac women's rugby as well as in the France women's national rugby union team.

She competed at the 2021 Rugby World Cup, and 2022 Women's Six Nations Championship.

Career 
Mélissande Llorens began rugby at the age of 12 at Tyrosse, then joined the Toulouse women's rugby hope center in 2017. She joined Blagnac Women's Rugby in 2018. At the same time, she pursued nursing studies at the University Hospital of Toulouse.

She played for the first time in the France team on 6 November 2021, for a match against South Africa won 46 to 3. Entering the 68th minute, she scored a try four minutes later, which would be called "try of the year 2021”  by the French Rugby Federation.

References 

2002 births

Living people
French female rugby union players